La Tortue ou l'Ecalle,  Île Tortue or Turtle Island is a small rocky islet off the north-eastern coast of Saint Barthélemy in the Caribbean. Referencing tortoises, it forms part of the Réserve naturelle nationale de Saint-Barthélemy with several of the other northern islets of St Barts.

Important Bird Area
The island has been recognised as an Important Bird Area (IBA) by BirdLife International because it supports breeding colonies of royal terns and laughing gulls, as well as a few pairs of red-billed tropicbirds.

References

Important Bird Areas of Saint Barthélemy
Environment of Saint Barthélemy
Seabird colonies
Islands of Saint Barthélemy